Mathias Gydesen (24 August 1988, Allerød) is a Danish swimmer. At the 2012 Summer Olympics he finished 30th overall in the heats in the Men's 100 metre backstroke and failed to reach the semifinals.

References

Danish male backstroke swimmers
Living people
Olympic swimmers of Denmark
Swimmers at the 2012 Summer Olympics
1988 births
People from Allerød Municipality
Sportspeople from the Capital Region of Denmark
20th-century Danish people
21st-century Danish people